Jesse Jordan Band is a South African rock band. Part of a new South African wave of artists, its singles “There Goes My Mind” and “Moneyline” charted on South Africa's national commercial station 5FM.

Band members
 Jesse Jordan - Vocals, Acoustic Guitar
 Alex Power - Keyboard, Bass, Backing Vocals
 Heindrich Schultz - Guitars, Backing Vocals
 JP Crouch - Drums
 Sheree Power - Rhythm Guitar

Discography
Lately When She Cries
 Eastern Bridge
 Tears In Her Eyes
 Scream
 She's Leaving
 Feeling Wasted
 Wendy
 Dream About The Moon
 Reason With The Rain
 Who Killed Biggie?
 Lately When She Cries
 Mary-Anne

Flipside
 Peace Of Mind
 Love Struck
 Flipside
 Satellite
 Holler
 I Feel
 Moneyline
 Phaze
 Shotgun
 Soul
 Be Myself
 There Goes My Mind

Inconsistent Behaviour
 Coming Clean
 Moneyline
 Flipside
 Not Here
 Soul
 I Need
 Satellite
 There Goes My Mind
 Would I Lay Down
 Shotgun
 I Wanna Hold Your Hand
 Twisted Youth

External links
 Jesse Jordan Band official website
  Myspace page for JJB
 Listen to Jesse Jordan Band

South African alternative rock groups